Step Afrika! is a dance company dedicated to the African-American tradition of "stepping". It is a non-profit organization that tours nationally and internationally, presents residencies and workshops worldwide, and uses "stepping" as an educational tool. Their dance style is a fusion of South African gumboot dance and African American stepping.

History
Step Afrika! was founded in 1994 in South Africa through a collaboration between dancers from the United States and dancers from the Soweto Dance Theatre of Johannesburg, South Africa. The company moved to the United States in 1996, and relocated to its current headquarters, in the Atlas Performing Arts Center, on H Street NE, in 2006.

Since 2006, Step Afrika! has produced a Home Performance Series (HPS), and in 2011 the Company designed a HPS themed along the lines of Jacob Lawrence's Migration Series.

See also
Stepping (African-American)
Gumboot dance

References

External links

Dance companies in the United States
African-American dance
South African dancers
Dance in Washington, D.C.
Performing groups established in 1994
2006 in Washington, D.C.
Non-profit organizations based in Washington, D.C.